The Dominican Republic Weightlifting Federation  (FEDOMPESA)  is the governing body for the sport of weightlifting in the Dominican Republic.

History
The origins of Dominican Republic olympic weightlifting started in 1946, when the sport was first practiced on the Dominican Evangelical Church's patio in the Colonial Zone. Eridania Segura won the first medal in a World Championships in the 1992 edition before Yuderqui Contreras won the bronze medal in the 53 kg category at the 2005 World Weightlifting Championships.

References

External links
 

Dominican Republic
Federation
Weightlifting
Sports organizations established in 1956